Jokela is a Finnish surname, originating from the name of the town of Jokela, located 30 miles away from Helsinki. Many other locations have the same name around the country. , there are 7,000 Finnish people alive today who have this surname. Notable people with the surname include:

 Antti Jokela (born 1981), Finnish ice hockey goaltender
 Juha Jokela (born 1970), Finnish playwright and scriptwriter
 Mikko Jokela (born 1980), Finnish ice hockey defenceman
 Monica Vikström-Jokela (born 1960), Finnish-Swedish television script writer and author
 Leo Jokela (1927–1975), Finnish actor

References

Finnish-language surnames